John Chatwin (c. 1667 – after 1685) was an English poet of the Restoration.

Little is recorded of Chatwin's life. He went up to Emmanuel College, Cambridge in 1682, and graduated BA in 1686. Although only one of Chatwin's poems was published in his lifetime, over two hundred pages of verse in his hand survive in manuscript, including translations of two poems from the New Latin of Kazimierz and a version of Catullus 5 in rhyming couplets, both in MS. Rawl. poet. 94 in the Bodleian. The Bodleian volume was written in about 1682-5 and includes an impressive selection of original poems and translations.

References

Sources 

 Elliot, Alistair. “Catullus by Several Hands.” Translation and Literature 12, no. 2 (2003): 252–62. http://www.jstor.org/stable/40339948.
 Fordoński, Krzysztof and Piotr Urbański, eds., Casimir Britannicus: English Translations, Paraphrases, and Emulations of the Poetry of Maciej Kazimierz Sarbiewski. London: Modern Humanities Research Association, 2010.
 Kraszewski, Charles S. The Polish Review 53, no. 3 (2008): 380–85. http://www.jstor.org/stable/25779758.

1660s births

Year of death unknown
English poets
English translators
Translators from Latin
Latin–English translators
17th-century English male writers
17th-century English writers